SM Classics is a South Korean classical music label under SM Entertainment. It was established in June 2020 through the memorandum of understanding signed by SM and the Seoul Philharmonic Orchestra. The label will release songs of SM arranged in orchestral arrangement through the mutual cooperation and presentation of differentiated content beyond genres.

History 
On June 10, 2020, SM Entertainment and the Seoul Philharmonic Orchestra signed a memorandum of understanding (MoU) at the orchestra's practice room in Jongno-gu, Seoul. The MoU will focus on "expanding and developing" cultural content through collaboration between genres. Lee Sung-soo, the chief executive officer of SM, and Kang Eun-kyung, the CEO of Seoul Philharmonic Orchestra, attended the signing ceremony. The two companies will release the "newly arranged and played songs" of SM, which were "loved" by the public as the first project, through SM Station in early July. Additionally, it is the first time for Seoul Philharmonic Orchestra to release K-pop music and is expected to give a "different charm".

The MoU is the first of its kind in Korea to be joined by a "leading" K-pop entertainment company and a K-Classic orchestra. It was reported that SM and Seoul Philharmonic Orchestra is expected to lead the development of Korean cultural content, by informing the world of the "excellence of K-pop and K-Classic", through mutual cooperation and presenting differentiated content beyond genres. Previously, SM has received favorable reviews by releasing a wide range of genres created by colorful collaboration through its digital music open channel Station since 2016. It will introduce a "variety of content convergence" that extends to the classical music genre by establishing the classical label SM Classics. Red Flavor by Red Velvet was the first song arranged through orchestral arrangement of song and film music director Park In-young with performance of the orchestra.

Artists 

 SM Classics Town Orchestra

Discography

2016

2018

2020

2021

2022

References

External links 
 Official website

SM Entertainment subsidiaries
Classical music record labels
South Korean record labels
Record labels established in 2020